Sterculia hypochroa is a tree species described by Pierre, belonging to the genus Sterculia and the family Malvaceae (previously the Sterculiaceae, now relegated to a subfamily).  No subspecies are listed in the Catalogue of Life.  These trees are found in Vietnam, where they are known as trôm quạt.

References

External links
 

hypochroa
Flora of Indo-China
Trees of Vietnam